Flinders Lakes is a rural locality in the City of Logan, Queensland, Australia. It was gazetted in May 2016.

History
Flinders Lakes is situated in the Bundjalung traditional Indigenous Australian country. 

Flinders Lakes is part of the development corridor south of Brisbane in the Greater Flagstone development area. The origin of the locality name is based upon the views of nearby Flinders Peak.

Flinders Lakes was designated as a locality within Logan City  by the Department of Natural Resources and Mines in May 2016.

Future plans 
Planned development in Flinders Lakes includes a mixed-use zoned town centre, residential, parks and recreation, and knowledge based industries and services focusing on health, education, tourism and agriculture.

Planned transportation projects that would service Flinders Lakes and the Greater Flagstone development areas include passenger railway links between Salisbury and Beaudesert.

Education 
There are no schools in Flinders Lake. The nearest government primary schools are Flagstone State School in Flagstone to the east and Ripley Valley State School in South Ripley to the north-west. The nearest government secondary schools are Flagstone State Community College in Flagstone and Ripley Valley State Secondary College in South Ripley.

References

Suburbs of Logan City
Localities in Queensland